Motiva Enterprises, LLC, is an American company that operates as a fully-owned affiliate of Saudi Aramco. Headquartered in Houston, Texas, it had revenue of $37 Billion. Motiva operates as a distributor of Shell and 76 branded gasolines within its operating territory.

The company began as a 50–50 joint venture between Shell Oil Company (the wholly owned American subsidiary of Royal Dutch Shell) and Saudi Aramco (which had previously partened with Texaco) in 1997.

History 
In 1988, Texaco and Saudi Refining agreed to form a joint venture known as "Star Enterprises" in which Saudi Refining would own a 50 percent share of Texaco's refining and marketing operations in the eastern United States and Gulf Coast.

In 1997, Shell embarked on two joint ventures with Texaco in which the companies merged their marketing and refining operations. The operations in the western and midwestern United States were merged into a company called "Equilon". The Star Enterprises operation and Shell's eastern and southeastern operations were merged into a company called "Motiva". After Texaco merged with Chevron in 2001, Shell and Saudi Refining purchased Texaco's interests in the joint ventures. Equilon became a fully owned subsidiary of Shell, while Saudi Aramco and Shell each became equal owners of Motiva.

In 2016, Motiva obtained an exclusive license for the 76 gasoline brand on the east coast, previously a West Coast-only brand. In March 2017, Royal Dutch Shell plc signed definitive agreements with Saudi Refining Inc. that gave full ownership of refining and marketing joint venture Motiva Enterprises, LLC to Saudi Refining.

Operations 
Motiva Enterprises owns and operates the Port Arthur Refinery in Port Arthur, Texas. On 25 May 2012, Motiva officially completed its expansion of the refinery to a capacity of  making it the largest refinery in North America and the fifth largest in the world.

Motiva's products include diesel, gasoline, liquefied petroleum gas (LPG), aviation fuel, and lubricants which it supplies to American states in the South, Mid-Atlantic, and the Northeast. Marketing outlets include 5200 Shell and 76-branded service stations. There are 24 storage and distribution terminals.

References

External links 
 
 Motiva Announces Progress on Refinery Expansion Project on Shell US (archived, 25 Jun 2006)

Multinational joint-venture companies
Oil companies of the United States
Companies based in Houston
Texaco
Former Shell plc subsidiaries